Ben Delaney (born August 23, 1996) is a Canadian ice sledge hockey player. He won a bronze medal at the 2014 Winter Paralympics, and silver medals at the 2018 and 2022 Winter Paralympics.

Personal life

At the age of twelve, Delaney was diagnosed with osteosarcoma, the same cancer that Canadian hero Terry Fox had. He had an above the knee amputation with the replacement of his knee with ankle bones. Formerly an active and successful multi-sport stand up athlete, he took up sledge hockey in 2010 with the Ottawa Sledgehammers.

He graduated from St. Pius X High School in Ottawa, and now trains and competes for Team Canada full time.  Ben's parents are Anthony and Mary Ann and his one sister is Hannah. His father is also an avid sledge hockey player.

Career

Delaney made his Team Canada debut at the Four Nations pre-Paralympic tournament in Sochi, Russia in August and September 2014. On August 27, 2014, in his first game, against the Czech Republic, he scored his first goal.

He was selected to represent Canada at the 2014 Winter Paralympics, making him the youngest team member of Canada's sledge hockey athletes.

On March 8, 2014, Delaney scored his first goal at the Paralympics during Canada's 10-1 preliminary round victory over Sweden.

On March 18, 2018, Delaney added to his Paralympic medal collection with a silver medal at the Pyeongchang Paralympic Games.

References

External links
 
 

1996 births
Living people
Sportspeople from Ottawa
Canadian sledge hockey players
Paralympic sledge hockey players of Canada
Paralympic bronze medalists for Canada
Ice sledge hockey players at the 2014 Winter Paralympics
Para ice hockey players at the 2018 Winter Paralympics
Para ice hockey players at the 2022 Winter Paralympics
Medalists at the 2014 Winter Paralympics
Medalists at the 2018 Winter Paralympics
Medalists at the 2022 Winter Paralympics
Paralympic medalists in sledge hockey